Edaayankurichi is a village in the Udayarpalayam taluk of Ariyalur district, Tamil Nadu, India.

Demographics 

As per the 2001 census, Edaayankurichi had a total population of 4015 with 2000 males and 2015 females.

References 

Villages in Ariyalur district